General Kamensky may refer to:

Mikhail Kamensky (1738–1809), Imperial Russian Army general
Nikolay Kamensky (1776–1811), Imperial Russian Army General of the Infantry
Sergei Kamensky (1771–1834), Imperial Russian Army general

See also
Henryk Ignacy Kamieński (1777–1831), Polish Army brigadier general
Bronislav Kaminski (1899–1944), Russian-born German Waffen-SS major general
Franciszek Kamiński (1902–2000), Polish Army major general